is a Japanese long-distance runner who specializes in the marathon race.

Competition record
All results regarding marathon, unless stated otherwise

Personal bests 
5000 metres - 13:39.38 min (2002)
10,000 metres - 28:13.76 min (2000)
Half marathon - 1:01:54 hrs (2002)
Marathon - 2:07:52 hrs (2001)
Source:

References

External links
sports-reference
marathoninfo

1977 births
Living people
Sportspeople from Yamaguchi Prefecture
Japanese male long-distance runners
Japanese male marathon runners
Olympic male marathon runners
Olympic athletes of Japan
Athletes (track and field) at the 2004 Summer Olympics
Japan Championships in Athletics winners
21st-century Japanese people